Chrono.Naut / Nuclear Guru is a split EP featuring British heavy metal bands Electric Wizard and Orange Goblin, re-releasing Chrono.Naut and Nuclear Guru on CD, which had both previously been released separately on vinyl in 1997. It is the second split release to feature the two bands, the first of which was in 1995.

Track listing

Electric Wizard 
"Chrono.Naut / Chrono.Naut Phase II" – 17:06

Orange Goblin 
"Nuclear Guru" – 6:47
"Hand of Doom" (Black Sabbath) – 7:02

Personnel

Electric Wizard 
Jus Oborn – guitar, vocals
Tim Bagshaw – bass
Mark Greening – drums

Orange Goblin 
Ben Ward – guitar, vocals
Pete O'Malley – guitar
Martyn Millard – bass
Chris Turner – drums

References 

Orange Goblin albums
Electric Wizard EPs
1997 EPs
Split EPs
Man's Ruin Records EPs